The Recueil d'Arras is a mid 16th century manuscript. Tentatively attributed to the Netherlandish artist , the recueil (miscellany) comprises 293 paper folios, of which 289 (numbers 5–177, 179–293, and 271) contain copies of portraits of named historical people.

The book is named after the city of its current location, Arras in Northern France. It is not known who commissioned the book, or for what purpose; but it is of significant historical interest, as it reproduces many near contemporary depictions of known political, courtly, or artistic persons.

Portraits
The drawings are arranged by family or region, beginning with members of the English, Scottish and French royal families, the Hainault family and court, the Blois, the dukes and duchesses of Burgundy and the court of the Spanish Netherlands. The portraits are followed by series of warriors, ecclesiastics, writers and finally notable heretics.

The portraits including a self portrait by Hieronymus Bosch and a double portrait of Philip the Good and Charles the Bold, a copy of Jan van Eyck's Portrait of Baudouin de Lannoy and depictions of Margaret of York and Jacqueline, Countess of Hainaut, all of whom are named in the index contained in folios 1–4, a later addition probably based on notes Le Boucq made on the margins which have since been cut away.  The only non-historical portraits are of (the unidentified) Laure de Noves and Petrarch on folio 27I verso. The drawing as are all on black or red chalk on paper. Nine are lost, while only torn fragments remain of a small number of others. It was originally foliated using Roman numerals, this was changed to Arabic numerals by a later scribe.

References

Notes

Sources

 Bouchot, Henri. "Les portraits aux crayons des xvie et xviie siècles". 1884
 Campbell, Lorne. Journal of the Warburg and Courtauld Institutes, Volume 40, 1977

16th-century manuscripts